Vlastimil Brlica (2 December 1928 – 18 March 2019) was a Czech middle-distance runner. He competed in the men's 3000 metres steeplechase at the 1960 Summer Olympics.

References

1928 births
2019 deaths
Athletes (track and field) at the 1960 Summer Olympics
Czech male middle-distance runners
Czech male steeplechase runners
Olympic athletes of Czechoslovakia